Musasa Tshatsho Kabamba (born 31 May 1982) is a Congolese former footballer. He played as a striker or forward for the Congo National Team. He is the brother of Felix Mwamba Musasa.

Career
Musasa also played for Maritzburg United, Kaizer Chiefs, Mpumalanga Black Aces, Istanbulspor, Maccabi Herzliya, FC Saint Eloi Lupopo and Primeiro de Agosto.

International career
He was part of the Congolese 2004 African Nations Cup team, who finished bottom of their group in the first round of competition, thus failing to secure qualification for the quarter-finals. He has over 30 Caps for his country, on the International level, scoring 12 goals.

References

1982 births
Living people
Footballers from Kinshasa
Democratic Republic of the Congo footballers
Democratic Republic of the Congo expatriate footballers
Democratic Republic of the Congo international footballers
2004 African Cup of Nations players
2006 Africa Cup of Nations players
C.D. Primeiro de Agosto players
İstanbulspor footballers
Kaizer Chiefs F.C. players
Maritzburg United F.C. players
Association football forwards
Expatriate soccer players in South Africa
Expatriate footballers in Turkey
Expatriate footballers in Israel
Democratic Republic of the Congo expatriate sportspeople in South Africa
Democratic Republic of the Congo expatriate sportspeople in Turkey
21st-century Democratic Republic of the Congo people